Upshur County is the name of two counties in the United States:

 Upshur County, Texas
 Upshur County, West Virginia